David John McAllan (born 20 June 1980 in Edinburgh, Scotland) is a former professional speedway rider for Glasgow Tigers.

He has represented Scotland at international level and a former Scottish Junior Champion.

McAllan is unable to ride following an accident which almost paralysed him at Ashfield Stadium in 2007 while riding for Glasgow Tigers.

References 

1980 births
Living people
British speedway riders
Scottish speedway riders
Sheffield Tigers riders
Glasgow Tigers riders
Workington Comets riders
Edinburgh Monarchs riders
Newcastle Diamonds riders
Berwick Bandits riders
Stoke Potters riders